The Supreme Court of the United States handed down sixteen per curiam opinions during its 2005 term, which lasted from October 3, 2005, until October 1, 2006.

Because per curiam decisions are issued from the Court as an institution, these opinions all lack the attribution of authorship or joining votes to specific justices. All justices on the Court at the time the decision was handed down are assumed to have participated and concurred unless otherwise noted.

The cases for this term are listed chronologically, noting the midterm change in the Court's membership caused by the retirement of Justice Sandra Day O'Connor and the confirmation of Justice Samuel Alito to her seat on January 31, 2006.

Court membership

Chief Justice: John Roberts

Associate Justices: John Paul Stevens, Sandra Day O'Connor (retired January 31, 2006), Antonin Scalia, Anthony Kennedy, David Souter, Clarence Thomas, Ruth Bader Ginsburg, Stephen Breyer, Samuel Alito (confirmed January 31, 2006)

Dye v. Hofbauer

Schriro v. Smith

Kane v. Garcia Espitia

Eberhart v. United States

Bradshaw v. Richey

Wisconsin Right to Life, Inc. v. Federal Election Commission

Ministry of Def. & Support v. Elahi

Ash v. Tyson Foods, Inc.

Lance v. Dennis

Gonzales v. Thomas

Salinas v. United States

Whitman v. Dep't of Transportation

Youngblood v. West Virginia

Laboratory Corp. of America Holdings v. Metabolite Laboratories, Inc.

See also 
 List of United States Supreme Court cases, volume 546
 List of United States Supreme Court cases, volume 547
 List of United States Supreme Court cases, volume 548

Notes

References

 

United States Supreme Court per curiam opinions
Lists of 2005 term United States Supreme Court opinions
2005 per curiam